Wolf Rock TV is a 1984 American animated series produced by DIC Enterprises and Dick Clark Productions, featuring the voice of Wolfman Jack. The series ran for seven episodes on ABC before it was canceled due to low ratings. Wolf Rock TV was replaced by Scary Scooby Funnies, which consisted of reruns of Scooby-Doo and Scrappy-Doo shorts from The Richie Rich/Scooby-Doo Show (1980–1982).

The series was later reaired on syndication in 1989 with the other animated series Kidd Video in a segment known as "The Wolf Rock Power Hour". As of today, copies of the series remain unavailable to the public, though some animation cels and merchandise relating to the show have surfaced.

Synopsis
Wolfman hosts a rock music TV program with three teenagers, Sarah, Sunny and Ricardo, while playing some real live action music videos. A parrot named Bopper also appeared as their comic relief pet. They had a manager, Mr. Morris, who shows dislike towards the kind of music Jack showcases.

A segment was Wolf Rock News and another was The Rock N' Roll Museum with live-action interviews.

Cast
Wolfman Jack as himself
Frank Welker as Bopper
Jason Bernard as Mr. Morris
Robert Vega as Ricardo
Siu Ming Carson as Sarah
Noelle North as Sunny
Barbara Goodson as Mayor's Wife
William Callaway as Additional Voices
Maurice LaMarche as Additional Voices

Episodes

References

External links

 
Wolf Rock TV at Hollywood.com

1984 American television series debuts
1984 American television series endings
1980s American animated television series
American children's animated musical television series
American television series with live action and animation
Rock music television series
English-language television shows
American Broadcasting Company original programming
Television series by DIC Entertainment
Television series by DHX Media
Television series by Dick Clark Productions